The 207th Division was re-organized in September 1949 from 70th Corps and its 209th and 210th divisions. Its history could be traced to 14th Column of Jinjiluyu Military Region, formed in May 1948.

After its formation the division was under direct control of Huabei Military Region. 

Shortly after its activation, in December 1949 the division was disbanded.

References

中国人民解放军各步兵师沿革，http://blog.sina.com.cn/s/blog_a3f74a990101cp1q.html

Infantry divisions of the People's Liberation Army
Military units and formations established in 1949
Military units and formations disestablished in 1949